Giovanni Piacentini (born 9 April 1968 in Modena) is an Italian former professional footballer who played as a midfielder.

He played for 11 seasons (255 games, 2 goals) in the Serie A for A.S. Roma, ACF Fiorentina, Atalanta B.C. and Bologna F.C. 1909.

Honours
Fiorentina
Coppa Italia: 1995–96
Supercoppa Italiana: 1996

References

External links
 Career summary by playerhistory.com

1968 births
Living people
Italian footballers
Italy under-21 international footballers
Association football midfielders
Serie A players
Serie B players
Serie C players
Modena F.C. players
Calcio Padova players
A.S. Roma players
ACF Fiorentina players
Atalanta B.C. players
Bologna F.C. 1909 players